Maryam Arzouqi (born 6 March 1987) is a Kuwaiti sports shooter. She competed in the Women's 10 metre air rifle and women's 50 metre three position events at the 2012 Summer Olympics.

References

1987 births
Living people
Kuwaiti female sport shooters
Olympic shooters of Kuwait
Shooters at the 2012 Summer Olympics
Sportspeople from Kuwait City
Shooters at the 2006 Asian Games
Shooters at the 2010 Asian Games
Shooters at the 2014 Asian Games
Asian Games competitors for Kuwait